Eliška Pešková (1833–1895) was a major Czech stage actor and playwright. She published about 50 plays, many of which were translated to other languages. She belonged to the leading stage actors of her time and many of the next generation Czech actors were influenced by her. She is most remembered for her roles as heroines in romantic drama. She was married to the dramatist Pavel Švanda ze Semčic.

References 

 BOLESLAVSKÝ, Josef Mikuláš. Divadelní almanah : 1869. Praha: Mikuláš a Knapp, 1869. Dostupné online. Heslo Pešková Eliška, s. 209.

1833 births
1895 deaths
19th-century Czech actors
Czech stage actresses
19th-century Czech dramatists and playwrights
19th-century women writers
Czech women dramatists and playwrights